The Sundrun is a river in the Sakha Republic (Yakutia) of the Russian Federation.

Course
It has its sources in the Ulakhan-Sis Range and flows roughly northeastwards across the Kondakov Plateau.  Leaving the uplands, it crosses the Yana-Indigirka Lowland tundra, part of the greater East Siberian Lowland. It flows first in a roughly eastern and then, more than halfway through its course, in a northern direction. Its mouth is in the East Siberian Sea at the western end of the Kolyma Bay. The Sundrun River freezes up in early October and remains icebound until June.

Tributaries  

Khroma-Sundrun Interfluvial Area
The Kytalyk Wetlands, located between the Sundrun and the Khroma, are an ecologically important area, providing a favorable habitat for many rare animals. It is practically uninhabited and full of lakes and marshes. Siberian cranes are abundant in the Sundrun River wetlands.

The lesser white-fronted goose, Brent goose, Bewick's swan and the spectacled eider are also found in the Khroma-Sundrun Interfluvial Area.

There is also a wild reindeer population in the Sundrun basin.

Sundrun Kekurs
The "Sundrun Kekurs" (Сундрунские кекуры) are the natural kigilyakh-type rock formations of the Ulakhan-Sis Range and Suor Uyata, located in the upper course of the river.

See also
List of rivers of Russia

References

External links
Wild reindeer

Rivers of the Sakha Republic
Drainage basins of the East Siberian Sea
East Siberian Lowland